Accel Transmatic Limited  is a company headquartered in Chennai, India. The company's major focus areas are Product R&D and development, software R&D and development & Animation. Accel Transmatic is a publicly traded company listed on the Bombay Stock Exchange (BSE)

The company has it main operations in Chennai, & Trivandrum in India. The company also has subsidiaries in California, United States & Tokyo, Japan.

History 

Accel Transmatic Limited was originally established as Transmatic Systems Ltd (TSL) in the year 1986 by two entrepreneurs from Kerala, M R Narayanan and T Ravindran, with equity participation from Kerala State Industrial Development Corporation, and IDBI. The company was promoted to develop and manufacture professional electronic products and communication systems in the state of Kerala, India.

In 1991 TDICI, the venture capital arm of ICICI provided funding for expansion/diversification to manufacture High Speed Dot matrix printers in collaboration with OutPut Technology Corporation (OTC) of USA.

In 1994 the company had its IPO, the issue was oversubscribed and the company got listed in the Mumbai, Chennai, Cochin Stock Exchanges.

In 2002, the company diversified into software and technologies space by merging with other technology companies. It approached Accel Limited, an established IT business group based in Chennai for a possible acquisition of the company. Accel Limited acquired the shares held by one of the promoters of the company and the acquisition was completed by August 2003 and thus the company became an Accel group company. Accel's management decided to create a new diversified portfolio for Transmatic Systems by merging two of the group entities namely, Accel Software and Technologies and Accel IT Academy. It was also decided to acquire an embedded software development company based in Technopark, Thiruvananthapuram, namely Ushus Technologies Pvt Ltd (UTPL) into TSL through the merger process, since they were complementary to the business of TSL. Accordingly, a merged entity had been formed effective from 01-01-2004 by the name, Accel Transmatic Ltd (ATL). The legal completion of the merger was completed on 9 February 2005.

In 2007, Accel Transmatic expanded its animation production by opening up a motion-capture facility in the Kinfra-Film & Video Park in Thiruvananthapuram.

In 2011, Accel Transmatic after completing necessary approvals from Shareholders and board decided to shut Software Operations (Technologies Division - including overseas subsidiary, Accel North America, Inc.), to focus better on  Animation and Media Company.

Subsidiaries
Accel North America (ANA)
Accel Solutions Japan

References

Software companies of India
Companies based in Chennai
Software companies established in 1986
Indian companies established in 1986
1986 establishments in Tamil Nadu
Companies listed on the Bombay Stock Exchange